Point Weyland is a headland located on the west coast of Eyre Peninsula in South Australia about  west south-west of the town of Venus Bay and about  north north-west of the town of Elliston. The point which is located within Anxious Bay is the southern extremity of the opening to Venus Bay. It was named by Matthew Flinders on 10 February 1802. The point has been within the boundary of the Venus Bay Conservation Park since 1977 while the waters adjoining its shoreline have been within a habitat protection zone in the West Coast Bays Marine Park since 2012.

References

Headlands of South Australia
Eyre Peninsula
Great Australian Bight